Nokia 105 is a mobile phone released in 2013 aimed at markets in developing nations marketed and manufactured by Nokia.

Specification 

Nokia 105 is a featurephone made by Nokia. The phone was released in 2013. It was first unveiled at the Mobile World Congress in 2013. The Nokia 105 is said to offer up to 35 days of standby time on a single charge and up to 12.5 hours of talk time. Furthermore, it includes a flashlight and an FM radio.

Other uses 
A report by Conflict Armament Research specified the 105 Type RM-908 Nokia phone, purchased between May and November 2014, was being "consistently used" by ISIS in Iraq to produce a type of remote controlled improvised explosive device.

See also 
 Nokia 130
 Nokia 215
 List of Microsoft hardware
 Nokia 105 (2015)

References

External links 
 

105 (2015)
Nokia 105 (2015)
Mobile phones introduced in 2013
Computer-related introductions in 2013
Mobile phones with user-replaceable battery